Founded in 1923, Aeroflot, the flag carrier and largest airline of Russia (and formerly the Soviet Union) (formerly the world's largest airline), has had a high number of fatal crashes, with a total of 8,231 passengers dying in Aeroflot crashes according to the Aircraft Crashes Record Office, mostly during the Soviet-era, about five times more than any other airline. From 1946 to 1989, the carrier was involved in 721 incidents. From 1995 to 2017, the carrier was involved in 10 incidents. In 2013, AirlineRatings.com reported that five of the ten aircraft models involved in the highest numbers of fatal accidents were old Soviet models.

Following is a list of accidents and incidents Aeroflot experienced from 1932 to the present.

1930s

1940s

1950s

1960s

1970s

1980s

1990s

2000s
 On 21 September 2001, Ilyushin Il-86 (RA-86074) landed gear-up at Dubai Airport due to pilot error; all 322 passengers and crew survived, but the aircraft was written off. The aircraft was operating an international scheduled Moscow-Dubai passenger service as Flight 521.
 On 30 June 2008, Tupolev Tu-154M (RA-85667) suffered an uncontained engine failure on takeoff from Pulkovo Airport en route to Moscow as Flight 846; all 112 passengers and crew survived, but the aircraft was written off and was parked at Pulkovo Airport where it was broken up in August 2009. This accident led Aeroflot to retire the Tu-154 from service beginning in late 2008 and completely retired all Tu-154s by 2010 and replaced them with Airbus A320 family aircraft.
 On 14 September 2008, Aeroflot Flight 821 operated by Aeroflot-Nord in a service agreement with Aeroflot as its subsidiary, crashed on approach to Perm Airport, Russia due to pilot error. All 88 people on board; including 6 crew members and 82 passengers, were killed in the crash.
 On 3 June 2009, Boeing 737-500 (VP-BXM) suffered severe damage by a hailstorm while on approach to Simferopol en route from Moscow. The aircraft was written off and stored at Simferopol (with engines removed) where it was last seen in August 2011.

2010s
 On 3 June 2014, Ilyushin Il-96 RA-96010 was damaged beyond economical repair in a fire while parked at Sheremetyevo International Airport, Moscow.
 On 3 January 2017, Airbus A321 VP-BES overran the runway on landing at Khrabrovo Airport, causing the nosegear to collapse; the aircraft, operating a Moscow–Kaliningrad service as Flight 1008, suffered minor damage.
On 5 May 2019, Sukhoi Superjet 100 RA-89098 operating a Moscow-Murmansk service as Flight 1492 suffered an in-flight emergency and subsequently caught fire during an emergency landing at Sheremetyevo International Airport, where it burned out. 41 of the 78 people on board were reported dead.

2020s

On 1 August 2020, a fuel truck hit the nose of a parked Airbus A321-211 at Moscow's Sheremetyevo Airport, Russia, crushing the driver's cabin and seriously damaging the nose of the aircraft.

See also
 Transport in the Soviet Union

Notes

References 

 
Lists of aviation accidents and incidents
Accidents and incidents by airline of Russia
Aviation accidents and incidents in the Soviet Union